Winifred Horsbrugh Moberly (1 April 1875 – 6 April 1928) was a British academic administrator, the principal of St Hilda's College, Oxford, from 1919 to 1928.

She was born in Calcutta, British India on 1 April 1875, the ninth child and fourth daughter of Charles Morris Moberly (1837–1897), an officer in the Madras Staff Corps, and his wife, Eliza Augusta Dorward (1841–1909), the daughter of James Dorward of Trichinopoly.

Her elder sister Ethel Charlotte Moberly was married to the Russian-born British novelist Fred Whishaw, and Winifred visited them in St Petersburg in her younger years.

She was educated at Winchester High School, Sydenham High School and Lady Margaret Hall, Oxford.

In 1915 she was honorary secretary of the Home Help Society. This was set up by the Central Committee on Women's Employment to train unskilled, middle-aged, working-class women to carry out domestic duties for poor households where the mother was incapable due to, for example, illness. At the end of 1915 she went out to Petrograd, Russia where, in the administrator role, she helped set up a Millicent Fawcett Hospital unit: a maternity unit for the relief of Polish refugees. She remained in this role until early 1917.

In October 1917 she was appointed area secretary of the Young Women's Christian Association in Calais. There she helped set up recreation huts and canteens for the Women's Army Auxiliary Corps. She held this role until July 1918 and was awarded the British War Medal for this work.

She died of heart failure after a long illness at Laverstock, Wiltshire on 6 April 1928.

References

1875 births
1928 deaths
First women admitted to degrees at Oxford
Principals of St Hilda's College, Oxford
Alumni of Lady Margaret Hall, Oxford
People educated at Sydenham High School